was a feudal domain under the Tokugawa shogunate of Edo period Japan, located in Kazusa Province (central modern-day Chiba Prefecture). It was centered on Sanuki Castle in what is now the city of Futtsu, Chiba.

History
The original Sanuki Castle was built by the Satomi clan, rulers of most of the Bōsō Peninsula during the Sengoku period. Following the Battle of Odawara in 1590, the Kantō region by was assigned to Tokugawa Ieyasu by the warlord Toyotomi Hideyoshi, who also restricted the Satomi to Awa Province for their lukewarm support of his campaigns against the Later Hōjō clan. Tokugawa Ieyasu appointed Naitō Ienaga, one of his hereditary retainers, to be daimyō of the newly formed 20,000 koku  Sanuki Domain.

During the Siege of Fushimi in 1600 prior to the Battle of Sekigahara, Naito Ienaga was one of the last defenders of Fushimi Castle to fall to the forces of Ishida Mitsunari. He was succeeded by his son, Naito Masanaga, who was awarded an additional 10,000 koku for his efforts at the Siege of Osaka. He gained another 10,000 koku for his participation in the suppression of the Satomi clan at Tateyama Domain in Awa Province, and yet another 5,000 koku when Shōgun Tokugawa Hidetada visited on an extended falconry expedition, thus bringing his total revenues to 45,000 koku. He was subsequently transferred to Iwakidaira Domain in Mutsu Province.

His replacement, Matsudaira Tadashige, was an 8,000 koku hatamoto of Fukuya Domain in Musashi Province, who was elevated to the ranks of the daimyō with an additional 7,000 koku stipend. He was subsequently transferred to Tanaka Domain in Suruga Province and Sanuki Domain reverted to tenryō territory directly under the control of the Tokugawa shogunate.

In January 1639, the domain was revived for Matsudaira Katsutaka, a former jisha-bugyō, whose holdings had reached 15,000 koku, qualifying for the status of daimyō. However, the Matsudaira clan was dispossessed from Sanuki under the tenure of his son, Matsudaira Shigeharu, for mismanagement, and Sanuki Domain again lapsed to tenryō status.

In May 1710, the domain was reestablished as a 16,000 koku holding for Abe Masatane, formerly daimyō of Kariya Domain in Mikawa Province. The Abe clan continued to rule Sanuki until the Meiji Restoration. The final daimyo of Sanuki Domain, Abe Masatsune, initially served with the pro-Tokugawa forces in the Boshin War against the strong advice of his senior retainers and refused to surrender his armory to the new Meiji government. He was subsequently imprisoned for a time, but was pardoned, and was appointed domain governor under the new administration, until the abolition of the han system in July 1871 and subsequently became a viscount under the kazoku peerage. Sanuki Domain became “Sanuki Prefecture”, which merged with the short lived “Kisarazu Prefecture” in November 1871, which later became part of Chiba Prefecture.

The domain had a population of 401 samurai in 91 households, 111 ashigaru in 29 households, and 16,908 commoners in 3314 households per a census in 1869. The domain maintained its primary residence (kamiyashiki) in Edo at Soto-Sakurada.

Holdings at the end of the Edo period
Although most domains in the han system, consisted of several discontinuous territories calculated to provide the assigned kokudaka, based on periodic cadastral surveys and projected agricultural yields, Sanuki Domain was a compact territory located entirely within Kazusa Province.
Kazusa Province
55 villages in Amaha District
1 village in Mouda District
6 villages in Ichihara District

List of daimyōs

References

 Bolitho, Harold. (1974). Treasures Among Men: The Fudai Daimyo in Tokugawa Japan. New Haven: Yale University Press.  ;  OCLC 185685588
Kodama Kōta 児玉幸多, Kitajima Masamoto 北島正元 (1966). Kantō no shohan 関東の諸藩. Tokyo: Shin Jinbutsu Ōraisha.
 Nussbaum, Louis Frédéric and Käthe Roth. (2005). Japan Encyclopedia. Cambridge: Harvard University Press. ; OCLC 48943301

External links 
  Sanuki on "Edo 300 HTML"

Notes

Domains of Japan
1590 establishments in Japan
States and territories established in 1590
1871 disestablishments in Japan
States and territories disestablished in 1871
Kazusa Province
History of Chiba Prefecture